South Korean singer-songwriter Roy Kim has received 10 awards from 13 nominations since his coronation as the Superstar K4 winner in 2012. He has additionally won a total of five music program awards, with four different songs. Kim is the recipient of a Gaon Chart K-Pop Award, two Golden Disk Awards, a Mnet Asian Music Award, and a HITO Music Award for Favorite Foreign Artist.

Awards and nominations

APAN Star Awards

Gaon Chart K-Pop Awards

Golden Disk Awards

Korea Best Dresser Swan Awards

Korea Drama Awards

Korean Popular Music Awards

MBC Plus X Genie Music Awards

Melon Music Awards

Mnet 20's Choice

Mnet Asian Music Awards

Paeksang Arts Awards

Seoul Music Awards
The Seoul Music Awards is an awards show founded in 1990 that is presented annually by Sports Seoul for outstanding achievements in the music industry in South Korea.

International

HITO Music Awards

Other Awards

References

Roy Kim